This is a list of Winnipeg Jets award winners. It also includes players and data from the previous incarnation of the franchise, the Atlanta Thrashers. It does not include players and data from the original Winnipeg Jets, with the exception of the Winnipeg Jets Hall of Fame membership.

League awards

Team trophies
The Winnipeg Jets franchise has not won any of the team trophies the National Hockey League (NHL) awards annually — the Stanley Cup as league champions, the Clarence S. Campbell Bowl as Western Conference playoff champions and the Presidents' Trophy as the team with the most regular season points.

Individual awards

All-Stars

NHL first and second team All-Stars
The NHL first and second team All-Stars are the top players at each position as voted on by the Professional Hockey Writers' Association.

NHL All-Rookie Team
The NHL All-Rookie Team consists of the top rookies at each position as voted on by the Professional Hockey Writers' Association.

All-Star Game selections
The National Hockey League All-Star Game is a mid-season exhibition game held annually between many of the top players of each season. Fifteen All-Star Games have been held since the Winnipeg Jets franchise entered the league as the Atlanta Thrashers in 1999, with at least one player chosen to represent the franchise in each year except 2002. The All-Star game has not been held in various years: 1979 and 1987 due to the 1979 Challenge Cup and Rendez-vous '87 series between the NHL and the Soviet national team, respectively, 1995, 2005, and 2013 as a result of labor stoppages,  2006, 2010, and 2014 because of the Winter Olympic Games, and 2021 as a result of the COVID-19 pandemic. The franchise hosted one of the games while it was in Atlanta. The 56th took place at Philips Arena.

 Selected by fan vote
 All-Star Game Most Valuable Player

Career achievements

Hockey Hall of Fame
The following is a list of Atlanta Thrashers / Winnipeg Jets franchise players and personnel who have been enshrined in the Hockey Hall of Fame.

Retired numbers

The Winnipeg Jets have not retired any of their jersey numbers. Number 37 was not issued by the franchise between 2003 and 2016 following the death of player Dan Snyder in 2003.  Goaltender Connor Hellebuyck has worn the number since 2016, with the blessing of the Snyder family. Also out of circulation is the number 99 which was retired league-wide for Wayne Gretzky on February 6, 2000.

Winnipeg Jets Hall of Fame
On July 15, 2016, the Jets announced the creation of the Winnipeg Jets Hall of Fame, to honour the impact and accomplishments of the team's hockey legends and celebrate the rich history of professional hockey in the city. This list thus includes former players from the original Winnipeg Jets franchise The inaugural inductees were the "HOT Line" consisting of Anders Hedberg, Bobby Hull and Ulf Nilsson, and they were inducted on October 19, 2016.

Team awards

Community Service Award
The Community Service Award is an annual award which is given to the player "for his commitment to our community through charitable involvement, school, hospital and community visits and other philanthropic endeavors."

Dan Snyder Memorial Trophy

The Dan Snyder Memorial Trophy is an annual award given to the player "who embodies perseverance, dedication and hard work without reward or recognition, so that his team and teammates might succeed."

Three Stars of the game Award
The Three Stars of the game Award is an annual award given to the player who earns the most points from Star of the game selections throughout the regular season.

Defunct team awards

Players' Player Award
The Players' Player Award was an annual award which was discontinued after the franchise moved from Atlanta to Winnipeg in 2011.

Team MVP
The Team MVP award was an annual award which was discontinued after the franchise moved from Atlanta to Winnipeg in 2011.

Other awards

See also
List of National Hockey League awards

Notes

References

Winnipeg Jets
award
award